Jawachi "Joshua" Nzeakor (born June 13, 1997) is an American-Nigerian professional basketball player for the Birmingham Squadron of the NBA G League.

Professional career
Nzeakor signed with Malian club AS Police of the Basketball Africa League (BAL). 

A year later, Nzeakor joined the Memphis Hustle of the NBA G League. On January 10, 2022, he recorded 6 points and 7 rebounds in his debut during a 132–130 defeat to the Santa Cruz Warriors.

In March 2022, Nzeakor signed with Guinean club SLAC ahead of the second season of the BAL.

On July 28, 2022, he joined Correcaminos UAT Victoria of the Liga Nacional de Baloncesto Profesional (LNBP).

Texas Legends (2022–2023)
On November 3, 2022, Nzeakor was named to the opening night of the Texas Legends. On January 23, 2023, Nzeakor was waived.

Birmingham Squadron (2023–present)
On January 25, 2023, Nzeakor was acquired by the Birmingham Squadron.

BAL career statistics

|-
| style="text-align:left;"|2021
| style="text-align:left;"|Police
| 3 || 3 || 31.7 || .565 || .167 || .692 || 8.3 || 2.0 || 0.0 || 0.3 || 20.7
|-
| style="text-align:left;"|2022
| style="text-align:left;"|SLAC
| 5 || 5 || 32.6 || .417 || .182 || .615 || 6.2 || 1.6 || 0.6 || 0.0 || 13.6
|-
|-

References

External links
Josh Nzeakor at Proballers

Living people
1997 births
Lamar Cardinals basketball players
SLAC basketball players
Memphis Hustle players
Nigerian men's basketball players
American men's basketball players
AS Police basketball players
PS Karlsruhe Lions players
Atenas basketball players
Small forwards
Power forwards (basketball)
Correcaminos UAT Victoria players